The Lesser Evil is a 1912 American short silent drama film directed by D. W. Griffith and starring Blanche Sweet. A print of the film survives.

Cast
 Blanche Sweet as The Young Woman
 Edwin August as The Young Woman's Sweetheart
 Mae Marsh as The Young Woman's Companion
 Alfred Paget as The Leader of the Smugglers
 Charles Hill Mailes as The Revenue Officer / Policeman
 Charles West as The Go-Between
 William A. Carroll as In Smuggler Band
 Charles Gorman as In Smuggler Band
 Robert Harron as In Smuggler Band
 Harry Hyde as Policeman
 J. Jiquel Lanoe as In Smuggler Band
 Owen Moore (unconfirmed)
 Frank Opperman as In Smuggler Band
 Herbert Prior (unconfirmed)
 W. C. Robinson as In Smuggler Band

See also
 D. W. Griffith filmography
 Blanche Sweet filmography

References

External links

1912 films
1912 short films
American silent short films
American black-and-white films
1912 drama films
Films directed by D. W. Griffith
Silent American drama films
1910s American films